The Melancholy Dame is a short American comedy film made with an African American cast and released in 1929. It was an Al Christie film based on the  Octavus Roy Cohen comedy series called "Darktown Birmingham" published in the Saturday Evening Post . Arvid Gillstrom directed and Florian Slappey was portrayed by Charles Olden. The film was produced and released by Paramount Pictures, and includes racial caricatures. It has been described as the first African American talkie. It featured a vision of high society and comic dialogue set in a Birmingham restaurant with a piano and dance show. The Los Angeles Times summarized the plot as, "A cabaret owner’s wife demands that her husband fire the sexy star attraction (if he doesn’t, she warns, 'there’s going to be a quick call for an undertaker'). Little does she (or the singer’s husband) know that the singer and the club owner were once married." It is a 2-reel film. The film is extant and posted on YouTube along with other films from the series.

Cast
 James Edward Thompson as Permanent Williams
 Evelyn Preer as Jonquil Williams
 Roberta Hyson as Sappho Dill
 Spencer Williams (actor) as Webster Dill
 Charles Olden as Florian Slappey

References

External links 

1929 films
American black-and-white films
American silent feature films
1929 comedy-drama films
Melodrama films
1920s American films
Silent American comedy-drama films